Carinotrachia carsoniana is a species of medium-sized air-breathing land snails, terrestrial pulmonate gastropods in the family Camaenidae. This species is endemic to Australia.

References

Gastropods of Australia
Carinotrachia
Vulnerable fauna of Australia
Gastropods described in 1985
Taxonomy articles created by Polbot